Finspång Municipality (Finspångs kommun) is a municipality in Östergötland County in Sweden. Its seat is located in the town of Finspång, with some 13,000 inhabitants.

Nature
The municipality refers to itself as Sweden's most lake-dense municipality, with at least 170 named lakes.  The municipality boasts that one can swim in a different lake each day of the year as there are 366 different ones.

History
Finspång is a traditional industrial city. The first industries were established in 1580 when a Royal factory for cannon and cannon balls was supervised.  The industry was to continue for 300 years under supervision of the Dutch-stemming family De Geer.  By Louis de Geer (1622-1695), the Finspång Castle was constructed, and around it industries and an orangery developed into the city Finspång.  Today the two main industrial areas are those of turbines and aluminum processing.

Localities
Finspång (seat)
Rejmyre
Lotorp
Sonstorp
Falla
Hällestad
Ljusfallshammar
Grytgöl
Igelfors
Borggård
Butbro
Hävla
Bränntorp
Byle
Kolstad
Lämmetorp
Lövlund
Prästköp

Elections

Riksdag
These are the results of the Riksdag elections of Finspång Municipality since the 1972 municipality reform. The results of the Sweden Democrats were not published by SCB between 1988 and 1998 at a municipal level to the party's small nationwide size at the time. "Votes" denotes valid votes, whereas "Turnout" denotes also blank and invalid votes.

Blocs

This lists the relative strength of the socialist and centre-right blocs since 1973, but parties not elected to the Riksdag are inserted as "other", including the Sweden Democrats results from 1988 to 2006, but also the Christian Democrats pre-1991 and the Greens in 1982, 1985 and 1991. The sources are identical to the table above. The coalition or government mandate marked in bold formed the government after the election. New Democracy got elected in 1991 but are still listed as "other" due to the short lifespan of the party. "Elected" is the total number of percentage points from the municipality that went to parties who were elected to the Riksdag.

Twin towns
Finspång Municipality has formal twin town treaties with three cities. These treaties were signed in 1967.

 Stromberg, Germany
 Yvoir, Belgium
 Givet, France

Today there is no contact with Stromberg or Givet, and contact was broken with Yvoir before being reestablished in 1997.

Finspång also has (informally) established cooperation with seven other cities:
Dzierzgoń, Poland
Finsterwalde, Germany
Joutsa, Finland
Nordborg, Denmark
Salaspils, Latvia
Sibiu, Romania
Stade, Germany

(Source and more information)

Notable people born in Finspång
Louis Gerhard De Geer (1818–1896) - First Prime Minister of Sweden
Kerstin Ekman (born 1933) - author
Pär Arvidsson (born 1960) - butterfly swimmer
Bengt Baron (born 1962) - backstroke swimmer 
Liselotte Neumann (born 1966) - professional golfer
Dan Swanö (born 1973) - musician and music producer
Robert Steiner (born 1973) - professional soccer player

Sports
The following sports clubs are located in Finspång Municipality:

 Sonstorps IK 
 Torstorps IF

See also
Finspång Fief Hundred

References

External links

Finspång Municipality - Official site

Municipalities of Östergötland County